Duck Lake may refer to:

Canada
 Duck Lake (Vancouver Island), a lake in British Columbia
 Duck Lake, Halifax, a lake in Nova Scotia
 Rural Municipality of Duck Lake No. 463, Saskatchewan
 Duck Lake, Saskatchewan, a town

United States
 Duck Lake (Iowa), a lake in Allamakee County
 Duck Lake, Michigan, an unincorporated community and lake in Clarence Township, Calhoun County
 Duck Lake (Grand Traverse County, Michigan), a lake
 Duck Lake (Kalamazoo County), a lake in Michigan
 Duck Lake (Blue Earth County, Minnesota), a lake
 Duck Lake (Montana), a lake in Glacier County
 Duck Lake (New York), a lake in Cayuga County